König Ludwig Lauf is a long distance cross-country skiing race, that takes places in Germany, and is part of the international long distance cup Ski Classics and the Worldloppet series. The race is over distances of 50 km and 23 km in both classical and free technique.

It debuted in 1968 and has been a part of Worldloppet as long as Worldloppet has been around.

References

External links
History of the race

Cross-country skiing competitions
1968 establishments in West Germany
Recurring sporting events established in 1968
February sporting events
Sports competitions in Bavaria
Cross-country skiing competitions in Germany